This is a list of Saskatchewan's highways:

Only Highways 1, 2, 5, 6, 7, 11, 12, 16, and 39 contain sections of divided highway. Saskatchewan is the only province bordering the United States with no direct connection to the Interstate Highway System.

Named routes 
 Can Am Highway
Circle Drive
Hanson Lake Road
Little Swan Road
Louis Riel Trail
McBride Lake Road
Northern Woods and Water Route
Ring Road
Red Coat Trail
Regina Bypass
Saskatoon Freeway
Saskota Travel Route
 Trans-Canada Highway
Veterans Memorial Highway
  Yellowhead Highway

Primary (1–99) 
These are primary highways maintained by the provincial government. Almost all of these highways are paved for most of their length. Highways 1, 11, and 16 are the most important highways and are divided highways for much of their lengths, with some sections at expressway or freeway standards.

Northern (100–199) 
Major northern highways, usually corresponding to a "parent" 1-99 highway.

Secondary

200–299 
These are usually highways connecting from a "parent" 1-99 highway to a recreational area.

300–399 
These are usually highways connecting from a "parent" 1-99 highway to minor communities near the "parent" route.

Municipal roads

600–699 

600s highways are minor highways that run north and south; generally, the last two digits increase from east to west. Many of these highways are gravel for some of their length.

700–799 

700s highways are minor highways that run east and west; generally, the last two digits increase from south to north. Many of these highways are gravel for some of their length.

Highway 777—Highway 41 near Alvena to Highway 6 near Naicam

Northern secondary (900–999) 
These are roads that generally provide access to isolated, northern communities. Most of these highways are unpaved for their entire length.

See also 
Ministry of Highways and Infrastructure
Transport in Saskatchewan

References 

 
Saskatchewan provincial highways
Highways